The 2020 Melon Music Awards ceremony, organized by Kakao M through its online music store, Melon, took place virtually from December 2 through December 5, 2020 (dubbed as "MMA Week") in South Korea, with the main ceremony taking place on December 5 at 19:00 KST. This is the twelfth ceremony in the show's history, and the first to be held online and over a span of four days. It was held without an audience due to the COVID-19 pandemic.

BTS won 6 awards during the ceremony, sweeping all three Grand Awards (Daesangs) including Artist of the Year for the second consecutive year.

Judging criteria

Winners and nominees 
Voting for Melon's Top 10 Artists category opened on the Melon Music website on November 11 and continued until November 20. Only artists who released music between November 30, 2019, and November 10, 2020, are eligible. The longlist of nominees was selected based on a chart performance score (60% downloads and 40% streams) for each artist combined with weekly Melon Popularity Award votes achieved during the eligibility period. Voting for Category awards, including daesang and rookie awards, took place from November 21–26, 2020.

Winners are listed first and highlighted in bold.

{| class="wikitable"
! style="background:#EEDD85; width=;" | Top 10 Artists (Bonsang)
! style="background:#EEDD85; width=;" | Song of the Year (Daesang)
|-
| valign="top" |
 Kim Ho-joong
 BTS
 Baek Ye-rin
 Baekhyun
 IU
 Oh My Girl
 Lim Young-woong
 Zico
 Blackpink
 Iz*One
| valign="top" |
 BTS – "Dynamite"
 Blackpink – "How You Like That"
Yerin Baek – Square (2017)
 IU – "Eight" featuring Suga
 Zico – "Any Song"
 Red Velvet – "Psycho"
Hwasa – Maria
MC the Max – Bloom
Oh My Girl – Nonstop
SSAK3 – Beach Again
|-
! style="background:#EEDD85; width=;" | Artist of the Year (Daesang)
! style="background:#EEDD85; width=;" | Album of the Year (Daesang)
|-
| valign="top" |
 BTS
 Baek Ye-rin
 IU
 Lim Young-woong
 Zico
Blackpink
Baekhyun
Iz*One
Kim Ho-joong
Oh My Girl
| valign="top" |
 BTS – Map of the Soul: 7
 Iz*One – Bloom*Iz
 Baek Ye-rin – Every letter I sent you
 Oh My Girl – Nonstop
Blackpink – The Album
Baekhyun – Delight
Bol4 – Youth Diary II
Hwasa – María (EP)
NCT 127 – Neo Zone
Red Velvet – The ReVe Festival: Finale
|-
! style="background:#EEDD85; width=;" | Best New Artist
! style="background:#EEDD85; width=;" | Netizen Popularity Award 
|-
| valign="top" |
 Cravity
Weeekly
Treasure
 Cignature
 MCND
| valign="top" |
 BTS
 Iz*One
 Baekhyun
 Blackpink
 Apink
 IU
 Oh My Girl
 Suho
 SSAK3
 Lim Young-woong
|-
! style="background:#EEDD85; width=;" | Best Dance Award (Male)
! style="background:#EEDD85; width=;" | Best Dance Award (Female)
|-
| valign="top" |
 BTS – "Dynamite"
Seventeen – "Left & Right"
NCT Dream – "Ridin'"
SF9 – "Good Guy"
J. Y. Park featuring Sunmi – "When We Disco"
| valign="top" |
 Blackpink – "How You Like That"
Oh My Girl – "Nonstop"
Hwasa – "Maria"
Iz*One – "Fiesta"
Red Velvet – "Psycho"
|-
! style="background:#EEDD85; width:50%" | Best R&B/Soul Award
! style="background:#EEDD85; width:50%" | Best Rap/Hip Hop Award
|-
| valign="top" |
 Baek Ye-rin – "Square (2017)"
Baekhyun – "Candy"
Lee Hi – "Holo"
Taeyeon – "Happy"
Paul Kim – "But I'll Miss You"
| valign="top" |
 Yumdda, The Quiett, Deepflow, Paloalto & Simon Dominic – "I'mma Do"
BTS – "On"
 Jessi – "Nunu Nana"
 Zico – "Any Song"
 Rain, Jay Park, Haon, Sik-K, PH-1 – "Gang (Remix)"
|-
! style="background:#EEDD85; width=;" | Best OST Award
! style="background:#EEDD85; width=;" | Best Rock Award
|-
| valign="top" |
 Jo Jung-suk – "Aloha"
Gaho – "Start Over"
Kim Feel – "Someday, the Boy"
IU – "Give You My Heart"
Jeon Mi-do – "I Knew I Love"
| valign="top" |
 IU – "Eight" featuring Suga
 Suho – "Let's Love"
 N.Flying – "Oh Really"
 Day6 – "Zombie"
 Younha – "Dark Cloud"
|-
! style="background:#EEDD85; width=;" | Best Pop Award
! style="background:#EEDD85; width=;" | Best Ballad Award
|-
| valign="top" |
 Sam Smith – "To Die For"
 Ariana Grande and Justin Bieber – "Stuck With U"
 Harry Styles – "Watermelon Sugar"
 Jawsh 685, Jason Derulo, BTS – "Savage Love (Laxed –  Siren Beat) (BTS Remix)"
 Anne-Marie – "Birthday"
| valign="top" |
 Davichi  – "Dear."
IU and Sung Si Kyung – "First Winter"
Jung Seung-hwan – "My Christmas Wish"
MC the Max – "Bloom"
Baek Ji-young – "No Love, No Heartbreak"
|-
! style="background:#EEDD85; width=;" | Best Indie Award
! style="background:#EEDD85; width=;" | Best Trot Award
|-
| valign="top" |
 Bolbbalgan4 – Leo (featuring Baekhyun)| valign="top" |
 Lim Young-woong – "Trust in Me" Kim Ho-joong – "I Love You More Than Me"
 Second Aunt Kim Da-vi – "Gimme Gimme"
 Young Tak – "Jjin-iya"
  – "Blank Spaces"

|-
! colspan="2" style="background:#EEDD85; width=;" | Hot Trend Award 
|-
| colspan="2" valign="top" |
 Trot Men 6SSAK3
Jo Jung-suk
Zico
Sik-K, PH-1, Jay Park, Haon
|}

Other awards

 Performers 

 Presenters Day 1 Jae Jae, Wyatt (ONF), Lee Dae-hwi (AB6IX), Lee Jang-jun (Golden Child) – opening segment
 Davichi – Best Ballad Award & brief Q&A segmentDay 2 Jae Jae, Wyatt, Lee Dae-hwi, Lee Jang-jun – opening segment
 Jo Jung-suk – Best OST & brief Q&A segmentDay 3 Jeong Se-woon, Dr. Seo Chang-hun, Weeekly, Crying Nut – "The-Play" segment
 Shin Seok-cheol, Hong Soo-jin, Choi-hoon, Kim Hyun-ah, Juckjae – presented Best Session Instrumental Award & brief Q&A segmentDay 4'''
 Jeff Benjamin, David Amber, Mayu Wakisaka, Danny Lee, Andreas Oberg – opening Q&A segment
 Bae Suzy – narrator for intro and outro
 Yoo Yeon-seok – opening introduction
 Yoo Jae-suk – presented Album of the Year
 Kim Jun-soo – presented Best Dance Awards
 Ock Joo-hyun – presented Song of the Year
 Yoo Hee-yeol – presented Artist of the Year

References 

Melon Music Awards ceremonies
2020 music awards
Annual events in South Korea